Njivak  is a village in the municipality of Pelagićevo, Bosnia and Herzegovina.

References

Populated places in Pelagićevo
Villages in Republika Srpska